The Western New York League was a minor league baseball league that played briefly in the 1890 season. The four–team Independent level Western New York League consisted of franchises based exclusively in New York. The Western New York League permanently folded after the 1890 season.

History
The Western New York League began play as an Independent level minor league in 1890. The Bath Bathers, Canisteo, New York, Hornell, New York and Wellsville, New York teams were the four charter franchises.

The Western New York League began play on September 9, 1890. When the season ended on September 27, 1890, the Canisteo team was in 1st place with a 6–0 record. Canisteo was followed by Wellsville (3–3), Hornell (2–4) and the Bath Bathers (1–5) in the final standings.

Baseball Hall of Fame member John McGraw played the 1890 shortened season as a member of the Wellsville team. Aviator Alfred Lawson was a teammate of McGraw on the Wellsville team.

The Western New York League permanently folded after the 1890 season.

1890 Western New York League teams

Western New York League standings

1890

References

External links
Baseball ReferenceStats Crew

Defunct minor baseball leagues in the United States
Defunct professional sports leagues in the United States
Sports leagues established in 1890
Sports leagues disestablished in 1890
Baseball leagues in New York (state)